"Say It Ain't So, Joe" is a song written and performed by Murray Head. The song was released on Head's second studio album Say It Ain't So, and was also released as a single in 1975.

History
According to Head, he wrote the song about fallen heroes. He wrote the following comment in the liner notes when he re-released the song in 1995 on the album When You're in Love:
"Say It Ain't So, Joe" was provoked by a seventies documentary on Richard Nixon prior to his resignation. The presenter was asking the editor of a small town newspaper outside Washington, how, in the face of conclusive evidence and proof, his readers could still show such undying support for the president they elected. The editor likens the situation to a scandal in the twenties, when Joe Jackson, the famous baseball player, was rumoured to have taken a bribe to sink his team in the final of the World series. His fans hung around the stadium chanting "Say it ain't so Joe".

The song is about heroes and their "Clay feet'. It is also a plea from myself to the kind of 'Joe Public' who in fear of losing face, refuse to relinquish their faith in a fallen idol.

The song is on an album which has sold over a million copies and was produced by Paul Samwell-Smith, who recently decided to re-record the song. Shortly afterwards I was watching another documentary on the O.J. Simpson case and they showed a note pinned to his gate on which was written "Say it ain't so Joe". Two days later a friend, just returned from L.A., rang me to tell me they'd seen placards with that same old phrase. The occasion seemed apt for a re-release.

- Murray Head, 1994

Roger Daltrey's version
In 1977, Roger Daltrey covered the song for his third solo album One of the Boys. This cover version features Keith Moon (drums) and John Entwistle (bass) of The Who, as well as Jimmy McCulloch (guitar) of Paul McCartney's Wings. Daltrey's version was released as a single (apart from in the UK) and peaked at number 20 in the Netherlands, but failed to chart elsewhere.

Other covers
 The Hollies, in 1979, on album Five Three One - Double Seven O Four
 Gary Brooker, in 1979
 Game Theory, in 1985, live on KALX Berkeley; released on the 2014 reissue of Dead Center (Omnivore Recordings)
 Marian Gold, in 1996
 Tahures Zurdos, 1997 "Dime que no" (Spanish version)
 The Nolans, in 2001
 Sylvain Cossette, in 2001
 Nolwenn Leroy, in 2005, on the compilation album Déjà Musique Succès Vol.1 (Canada)
 Jim Leverton, in 2006, recorded live and released on album ''End of the Pier Show"
 Lena Hall, in 2020, recorded a version used in the 2020 TV series Snowpiercer

References

1975 singles
1975 songs
Island Records singles
Murray Head songs
British soft rock songs
British folk rock songs